Governor Wilkinson may refer to:

Charles Edmund Wilkinson (1801–1870), Acting Governor of British Ceylon in 1860
Richard James Wilkinson (1867–1941), Governor of Sierra Leone from 1916 to 1922